Friar Alberigo (died c. 1307) was a 13th-century Italian from Faenza. His family, the Guelph Manfredi family, were banished in 1274 from Faenza by their rivals, the Accarisis. The Manfredis returned in 1280, with the aid of a traitor, the Ghibelline Tebaldello del Zambrasi.

Later in his life Alberigo is said to have joined the Jovial Friars.

Alberigo appears in the Divine Comedy poem Inferno of Dante Alighieri, where he resides in the third ring of the ninth circle, the location of traitors to their guests. This is because of an episode where Alberigo had his brother and nephew killed during a banquet at his home. Alberigo's orders to bring fruit was the signal for the murder. Dante portrays him as regretting this crime, stating in Canto XXXIII that he is repaid in Hell in dates for the figs he called for at the banquet (dates being much more expensive than figs).

References
Alighieri, Dante; Ciardi, John (trans.) "The Inferno" (New York: The New American Library, Inc., 1954) , locations 4114–20.
Lansing, Richard (ed.) The Dante Encyclopedia (New York: Garland, 2000) , p. 10.

13th-century births
1307 deaths
People from Faenza